Comitas fusiformis is an extinct species of sea snails, a marine gastropod mollusc in the family Pseudomelatomidae, the turrids and allies

Distribution
This extinct marine species is endemic to New Zealand.

References

 Hutton, F. W. "Report on the geology of the north-east portion of the South Island, from Cook Straits to the Rakaia." Report on Geological Explorations during 1873 74 (1877): 27-58.
 Maxwell, P.A. (2009). Cenozoic Mollusca. Pp 232-254 in Gordon, D.P. (ed.) New Zealand inventory of biodiversity. Volume one. Kingdom Animalia: Radiata, Lophotrochozoa, Deuterostomia. Canterbury University Press, Christchurch.

fusiformis
Gastropods described in 1877
Gastropods of New Zealand